The Latvian Social Democratic Party (LSDP) was a political party in Latvia formed by a reformist wing of the Communist Party of Latvia.

On 14 April 1990, a pro-independence faction under Ivars Ķezbers split off from the LKP to form the Independent Communist Party of Latvia (LNKP). The main body of the LKP, under the leadership of Alfrēds Rubiks, remained loyal to the CPSU. Later that same year, on 14 September, the party was officially renamed the Democratic Labour Party of Latvia (LDDP). In 1995 it changed its name to LSDP. Originally a political party with communist and nationalist leanings, it was transformed into a social democratic organization by the party leader Juris Bojars.

The party co-operated with the Latvian Social Democratic Workers' Party in the 1995 elections, in the 1997 local government elections, and again in the 1998 elections. In May 1999 it merged into the Latvian Social Democratic Workers' Party.

External links
Official website (LSDSP)

References

Defunct political parties in Latvia
Pro-independence parties in the Soviet Union
Singing Revolution
Social democratic parties in Latvia
1999 disestablishments in Latvia
Political parties disestablished in 1999
Social democratic parties in the Soviet Union